Jiben Bose (1915 – 21 March 1975) was a Bengali Indian actor known for his serious-comical side role performances in Bengali cinema.

Biography
Bose was born in 1915 in Kolkata, British India. He was known for mainly supporting characters in Bengali cinemas. Bose started his career in the film Ankjijal in 1932 and performed continuously for five decades in film industry. He worked a number of movies with leading stars like Uttam Kumar. He died on 21 March 1975 in Kolkata.

Selected filmography
 Duranta Joy
 Biraj Bou
 Deshbandhu Chittaranjan
 Maa O Meye
 Antony Firingee
 Rajdrohi
 Mukhujey Paribar
 Ashanata Ghoorni
 Kinu Gowalar Gali
 Tridhara
 Bipasha
 Kancher Swarga
 Dui Bhai
 Raja-Saja
 Chaowa-Pawa
 Indrani
 Bardidi
  Sesh Paryanta
  Sasibabur Sansar
  Aasite Aasiyo Na
 Kabuliwala
 Sesh Anka
 Chirakumar Sabha
 Trijama
 Ekti Raat
 Sagarika
 Shap Mochan
 Bireswar Vivekananda
 Dashyumohan
 Raikamal
 Jamalaye Jibanta Manush
 Chheley Kaar
 Basu Paribar
 Kankal
 Krishan
 Simantik
 Maryada
 Bandhur Path
 Mantramugdhu
 Path Bendhe Dilo
 Pratikar
 Rani Rasmani
 Sesh Raksha
 Nandita
 Dampati
 Samadhan
 Kavi Joydev
 Nimai Sanyasi
 Parajay
 Parashmoni
 Hal Bangla
 Annapurnar Mandir
 Ankjijal

References

External links
 

1915 births
1975 deaths
Male actors in Bengali cinema
Indian male film actors
People from Kolkata
20th-century Indian male actors